The Great Western Railway (GWR) 4300 Class is a class of 2-6-0 (mogul) steam locomotives, designed by G.J. Churchward for mixed traffic duties. 342 were built from 1911–1932.

Background
In 1906 Churchward fitted a more powerful Standard No. 4 boiler to his successful 3100 Class 2-6-2T to create the GWR 3150 Class. These showed themselves to be successful locomotives but their  weight and  water capacity meant that they tended to be restricted to suburban passenger traffic. Churchward was looking forward to the replacement of various of his predecessor’s 2-4-0 classes on secondary duties. In 1911 he therefore designed a tender version of the 3150 class which would be suitable for a wide range of intermediate duties.

Design
The class was ‘a total synthesis of standard parts, using the outside cylinders of the Saint, the wheels of ‘31XX’ 2-6-2 tank and the No. 4 boiler, in its superheated form.’ No prototype was required as the fundamental design had proved itself.

Production series
The locomotives quickly proved themselves to be so useful that they were produced more or less continuously in a series of batches (or lots) over a twelve-year period (1911–1923), sometimes incorporating detailed differences. Two further lots were built in 1925 and 1932 by Churchward's successor, Charles Collett.

Lot 183
The first twenty examples, numbered 4301–4320, were delivered by Swindon Works between June and October 1911. These had inside steam pipes, and were among the first GWR locomotives to be fitted with top feed apparatus. Nos. 4311–4320 had boilers designed to operate at  pressure but only 4315 and possibly 4316 ever worked at that pressure.

Lots 193, 194 and 198
Three further batches, totalling a further forty locomotives (4321–4360) were built at Swindon and delivered June 1913 and May 1914, before the onset of the First World War impeded further production.

Lots 202 and 204 to 208
The class proved to be ‘just the type that was needed during the 1914–18 war and were accordingly built in considerable numbers during that period.’  Six batches, totalling one hundred locomotives (numbered 4361–4399, 4300, 5300–5359) were built between May 1915 and September 1918, and a further ten (5360–5369) between January and June 1919. From 1917 detailed changes were made to the design giving better weight distribution between the wheels which were later applied to other members of the class. 
Eleven examples of the class were transported to France during World War I in the service of the Railway Operating Division of the British Army and these were 5319–5326 and 5328–5330. One survives in preservation.

Lots 209, 211, 212, 216, and 230
The first three of these lots were for seventy locomotives built between June 1919 and July 1921 (Nos. 5370-99 and 6300-6341). Lot 216 was for a further 28 locomotives (6342–6369) but Swindon works was then unable to keep pace with the demand for them and only the first twenty were completed after delay, between March and December 1923. The remainder (6362-6369 and 7320/1) were later built under lot 230 in 1925.
6320 was converted to oil firing between 1947 and the equipment was removed in 1949.

Lots 218 and 222
As Swindon works could not keep pace an order was placed with Robert Stephenson and Company in 1921 for fifty locomotives (Nos. 6370–6399 and 7300–7319). The first 35 of these (Lot 218) were built by the company between April 1921 and January 1922. The remaining fifteen were built at Swindon from parts manufactured by RSH between November 1921 and January 1922. 
In 1925 Nos. 7300–7304 were modified for better balance and had detail alterations.

Lot 276
In 1932, Collett built a further twenty examples (9300–9319) to a modified design with side window cabs, outside steam pipes and a screw reverse. After passing into British Railways ownership, these locomotives were modified back to light buffer beam design and were renumbered 7322–7341 between 1956 and 1959.

8300 Class

The class were widely used in Devon and Cornwall where the track had many sharp curves. It was found that flange wear on the leading driving wheels became excessive as a result of these bends. In November and December 1927 additional weight was added to the front end of four examples so that the pony truck would be forced to impart more side thrust to the main frames on bends. These locomotives reverted to their original state, but between January and March 1928, 65 engines of 5300 series received additional weight on the pony truck, and 3000 was added to their running numbers, temporarily creating an ‘8300 Class’. However, the additional weight placed them in the Red category of route availability. From 1944 onwards there was a shortage of locomotives in the Blue category and so the additional weights were removed and the surviving locomotives resumed their original running numbers. The last to be returned to its original condition was 8393 in September 1948.

Use
The 4300 Moguls were the maids of all work on the GWR network and later the Western Region of British Railways. Employing a Standard number 4 boiler and the support struts similar to those fitted to the '2800' class, the class very quickly earned an excellent reputation in its ability to handle most types of traffic, from local stopping goods to main line expresses. According to O.S. Nock they "could handle the heavy goods work as well as the 'Aberdares' and could run up to 70 mph with passenger trains, in other words they were the ideal mixed traffic locomotive".

Oil firing 
Between 1945 and 1947, coal shortages caused the GWR to experiment with oil fired locomotives and alongside a number of Castle, Hall, 2800 and 2884 class locomotives, a single 4300, No. 6320, was converted to oil burning in March 1947. The experiment, encouraged by the government was abandoned in 1948 once the extra maintenance costs were calculated and the bill had arrived for the imported oil. No. 6320 was converted back to burn coal in August 1949.

Withdrawal

Although the class continued to be very useful and the final batch were still relatively new, 100 of the earlier examples were withdrawn between 1936 and 1939 and the wheels and motion of eighty were used for the Grange Class and twenty for Manor Class engines. It was intended to replace the whole class in this way but the advent of the Second World War in 1939 brought a temporary halt to withdrawals and the programme was never revived.
Further withdrawals resumed in 1948 under British Railways ownership, but the last six examples survived until 1964.

Accidents and incidents

Sixteen people were killed and 41 were injured.
One person was killed and six were injured.
On 7 September 1945, locomotive No. 6315 was hauling a mail and freight train that was derailed near , Denbighshire due to the trackbed being washed away following the failure of the bank of the Shropshire Union Canal. One person was killed and two were injured. The train's consist, except for a brake van, was destroyed in the ensuing fire.

Preservation
Only two examples have survived to preservation:

Note: Loco numbers in bold mean their current number.

5322 is the older of the two as it was built in 1917, during the Great War, at Swindon Works. It was sent, with several other members of the class, to France for hauling munitions and hospital trains. There it was painted in War Department livery and given the number ROD5322. Demobbed in 1919 at Chester it returned to the GWR fleet until it was withdrawn from service in April 1964. It was sent to Woodham Brothers scrapyard in Barry, South Wales. The first Barry locomotive to be subject to a preservation fund, it was the third locomotive to leave Woodham's: 5322 thus ended up as the sole early 43xx to be preserved. It was initially restored to working order, but was not steamed after 1975 until returning to steam in 2008 at the Didcot Railway Centre, restored to its 1919 War Department condition.

9303 is one of the final batch of 342 locomotives built between 1911 and 1932. They were built with larger cabs and had a weight attached to the buffer beam to place more weight on the leading pony wheels. This was done to reduce the wear on the leading driving wheels. In 1958 the weight was removed from the buffer beam to give the locomotive more route availability. At the same time it was renumbered 7325.

An engine similar to the 4300 class was rebuilt from 5193 (a GWR 5101 Class 2-6-2T) to become  a smaller boilered version of the class numbered 9351.

Model railways
Mainline Railways updated their OO gauge Mogul Class 4300 models in 1983, introducing models in GWR green and BR lined green.

See also 
 List of GWR standard classes with two outside cylinders

References

Sources

External links 

 Great Western archive page
 Class 4300 Details at Rail UK
 5322 Didcot page
 9303 SVR page

4300 Class
2-6-0 locomotives
Robert Stephenson and Company locomotives
Railway locomotives introduced in 1911
Railway Operating Division locomotives
Standard gauge steam locomotives of Great Britain